Judo was contested at the 2011 Summer Universiade from August 13 to August 17 at the No. 6, No. 7, and No. 8 Pavilions at the Shenzhen Conference and Exhibition Center in Shenzhen, China.

Medal summary

Medal table

Events

Men's events

Women's events

References

External links
 

Universiade
2011 Summer Universiade events
2011
Judo competitions in China